Jiangpu Road is the name of an interchange station on Shanghai Metro lines 8 and 18. It began operation on 29 December 2007. It later became an interchange station after the opening of Line 18 on 30 December 2021.

Station Layout

Places Nearby 
 Xinhua Hospital (Exit 2)

References

Railway stations in Shanghai
Shanghai Metro stations in Yangpu District
Railway stations in China opened in 2007
Line 8, Shanghai Metro
Line 18, Shanghai Metro